Kolbingen is a municipality in the district of Tuttlingen in Baden-Württemberg in Germany.  It is situated about 15 km northeast of Tuttlingen and 7 km from Mühlheim an der Donau.

Farming
To help people to help themselves Württemberg planted alleys of fruit-trees (Dienstbarkeit on private ground near streets). The tree farms from  William I of Württemberg, also the Brüdergemeinde delivered for free. The Kolbinger Goldbirne is a local tree.

References

External links
 Official Web site for the city of Kolbingen 

Tuttlingen (district)
Württemberg